Wu Nunatak is a nunatak about 8 nautical miles (15 km) north-northeast of Mount Weihaupt in the Outback Nunataks. Mapped by United States Geological Survey (USGS) from surveys and U.S. Navy air photos, 1959–64. Named by Advisory Committee on Antarctic Names (US-ACAN) for Tien H. Wu, glaciologist at McMurdo Station, 1966–67.

Nunataks of Victoria Land
Pennell Coast